The Mariner class was a class of six 8-gun gunvessels (sloops from  1884) built for the Royal Navy between 1883 and 1888. Four were built in the Naval Dockard at Devonport, and two elsewhere; the Acorn was built by contract at Jacobs Pill on the Pembroke River (a private yard founded in the 1870s by Sir Edward Reed), while the Melita was built in the Malta Dockyard, the only substantial ship of the Royal Navy ever to be built in the island.

Construction

Design

Designed by Nathaniel Barnaby, the Royal Navy Director of Naval Construction, the hull was of composite construction; that is, iron keel, frames, stem and stern posts with wooden planking.  The entire class were re-classified in November 1884 as sloops before they entered service.

Propulsion

Propulsion was provided by a 2-cylinder horizontal compound-expansion steam engine of  driving a single screw.

Sail plan

All the ships of the class were built as barque-rigged vessels, except Icarus, which had no main yards provided, making her a barquentine.

Armament

The class was designed and built to carry eight 5-inch 38cwt breech-loading guns, one light gun and eight machine guns.  Melita had 40cwt guns instead of 38cwt, and Reindeer had two of her guns removed.

Construction
All the ships were laid down in 1882-83. While most of the ships were completed relatively quickly, Melita took six years to build.  The intention behind building her at Malta was to make use of the substantial workforce at Malta Dockyard who were otherwise (it was felt) unemployed when the Mediterranean Fleet was away. The experiment cost £10,000 more than the British-built versions, and incurred substantial delay; it was not repeated, and Melita remained the only warship of any significant size ever built in Malta for the Royal Navy.

Ships

See also

Notes

References

 

Gunboat classes
 
 Mariner